Rein van der Kamp (born 17 July 1979) is a Dutch former professional basketball player. In his career, Van der Kamp played for Dutch Basketball League teams Landstede Basketbal, EiffelTowers Den Bosch and De Friesland Aris.

References

External links
Dutch Basketball League profile 

1979 births
Living people
Dutch basketball coaches
Dutch men's basketball players
Small forwards
Heroes Den Bosch players
Aris Leeuwarden players
Landstede Hammers players
Dutch Basketball League players
People from Meppel
Sportspeople from Drenthe